Kunda is a village in Viru-Nigula Parish, Lääne-Viru County, in northeastern Estonia. It is located just southeast of the town of Kunda. Kunda village has a population of 23 (as of 1 January 2011).

Writer Jüri Parijõgi lived in Kunda village. Also chemist Michael Wittlich (Mihkel Vitsut) was born in there.

References

Villages in Lääne-Viru County